Rajahmundry Rural Assembly constituency is a constituency in East Godavari district of Andhra Pradesh, representing the state legislative assembly in India. It is one of the seven assembly segments of Rajahmundry Lok Sabha constituency, along with Anaparthy, Rajanagaram, Rajahmundry City, Kovvur, Nidadavole, and Gopalapuram. Gorantla Butchaiah Choudary is the present MLA of the constituency, who won the 2019 Andhra Pradesh Legislative Assembly election from Telugu Desam Party. , there are a total of 254,339 electors in the constituency.

Overview 
It is part of the Rajahmundry Lok Sabha constituency along with another six Vidhan Sabha segments, namely, Anaparthy, Rajanagaram, Rajahmundry City, Kovvur, Nidadavole, and Gopalapuram.

Mandals 

The mandals and wards that form the assembly constituency are:

Members of Legislative Assembly Rajahmundry Rural

Election results

Assembly Elections 2009

Assembly elections 2014

Assembly elections 2019

See also 
 List of constituencies of the Andhra Pradesh Legislative Assembly

References 

Assembly constituencies of Andhra Pradesh